A forming press, commonly shortened to press, is a machine tool that changes the shape of a work-piece by the application of pressure. The operator of a forming press is known as a press-tool setter, often shortened to tool-setter.

Presses can be classified according to
 their mechanism: hydraulic, mechanical, pneumatic;
 their function: forging presses, stamping presses, press brakes,  punch press, etc.
 their structure, e.g. Knuckle-joint press, screw press
 their controllability: conventional vs. servo-presses

Shop Press
Typically consisting of a simple rectangular frame, often fabricated from C-channel or tubing, containing a bottle jack or hydraulic cylinder to apply pressure via a ram to a work-piece. Often used for general-purpose forming work in the auto mechanic shop, machine shop, garage or basement shops, etc. Typical shop presses are capable of applying between 1 and 30 tons pressure, depending on size and construction. Lighter-duty versions are often called arbor presses.

A shop press is commonly used to press interference fit parts together, such as gears onto shafts or bearings into housings.

Other presses by application
 A press brake is a special type of machine press that bends sheet metal into shape. A good example of the type of work a press brake can do is the back-plate of a computer case.  Other examples include brackets, frame pieces and electronic enclosures. Some press brakes have CNC controls and can form parts with accuracy to a fraction of a millimeter. Bending forces can range up to 3,000 tons.
 A punch press is used to form holes.
 A screw press is also known as a fly press.
 A stamping press is a machine press used to shape or cut metal by deforming it with a die. It generally consists of a press frame, a bolster plate, and a ram.
 Capping presses form caps from rolls of aluminium foil at up to 660 per minute.

An example of peculiar press control: servo-press
A servomechanism press, also known as a servo press or an 'electro-press, is a press driven by an AC servo motor. The torque produced is converted to a linear force via a ball screw. Pressure and position are controlled through a load cell and an encoder. The main advantage of a servo press is its low energy consumption; its only 10-20% of other press machines.

When stamping, it's really about maximizing energy as opposed to how the machine can deliver tonnage. Up until recently, the way to increase tonnage between the die and work-piece on a mechanical press was through bigger machines with bigger motors.

Types of presses

The press style used is in direct correlation to the end product. Press types are straight-side, BG (back geared), geared, gap, OBI (open back inclinable) and OBS (open back stationary). Hydraulic and mechanical presses are classified by the frame the moving elements are mounted on. The most common are the gap-frame, also known as C-frame, and the straight-side press. A straight-side press has vertical columns on either side of the machine and eliminates angular deflection. A C-frame allows easy access to the die area on three sides and require less floor space. A type of gap-frame, the OBI pivots the frame for easier scrap or part discharge. The OBS timed air blasts, devices or conveyor for scrap or part discharge.

History

Historically, metal was shaped by hand using a hammer. Later, larger hammers were constructed to press more metal at once, or to press thicker materials. Often a smith would employ a helper or apprentice to swing the hammer while the smith concentrated on positioning the work-piece.  Drop hammers and trip hammers utilize a mechanism to lift the hammer, which then falls by gravity onto the work.

In the mid 19th century, manual and rotary-cam hammers began to be replaced in industry by the steam hammer, which was first described in 1784 by James Watt, a British inventor and Mechanical Engineer who also contributed to the earliest steam engines and condensers, but not built until 1840 by British Inventor James Nasmyth.  By the late 19th century, steam hammers had increased greatly in size; in 1891 the Bethlehem Iron Company made an enhancement allowing a steam hammer to deliver a 125-ton blow.

Most modern machine presses typically use a combination of electric motors and hydraulics to achieve the necessary pressure. Along with the evolution of presses came the evolution of the dies used within them.

Safety
Machine presses can be hazardous, so safety measures must always be taken. Bi-manual controls (controls the use of which requires both hands to be on the buttons to operate) are a very good way to prevent accidents, as are light sensors that keep the machine from working if the operator is in range of the die.

References

External links

Metal forming handbook
Forging Industry Association

Metal forming
Machine tools
Articles containing video clips